Rogues en Vogue is the thirteenth album by Running Wild, released in 2005.

Track listing

Personnel
Rolf Kasparek – Vocals, All Guitars, some bass
Peter Pichl – Bass
Mattias Liebetruth – Drums

Production
Peter Pichl – Engineering (bass)
Katharina Nowy – Producer (additional)
Matthias Liebetruth – Engineering (drums)
Niki Nowy – Engineering (vocals), Mixing (vocals)
Rolf Kasparek – Producer, Engineering, Mixing, Music, Lyrics
Rainer Holst – Mastering
Rudolf Wintzer – Cover art

Charts

2005 albums
GUN Records albums
Running Wild (band) albums